Piraeus Prefecture was one of the prefectures of Greece. Created in 1964 as a separate Prefecture (Νομός) and after the dissolution of the prefecture in 1972 was one of the 4 prefectures (Νομαρχίες) of Attica prefecture, and from 1994, part of the Athens-Piraeus super-prefecture (1994–2011). The capital of the prefecture was Piraeus. As a part of the 2011 Kallikratis government reform, the prefecture was abolished, and its territory was divided into two regional units: Islands and Piraeus.

History
The prefecture covered the south-western part of the agglomeration of Athens, several islands in the Saronic Gulf (Salamis, Aegina, Agkistri, Poros, Hydra, Dokos, Spetses, Spetsopoula), Methana and Troizina on the Peloponnese peninsula, and the islands of Kythira and Antikythera south of the Peloponnese. An indication of the geographical diversity of the prefecture was the stark difference in population density between its seven mainland municipalities in the Athens urban area, which have 9,244.2 inhabitants/km2, and its detached outlying areas, which average only 85.83 inhabitants/km2 (and most of these on Salamis Island, at 395.40/km2, while the far-outlying parts have only 47.80/km2).

Municipalities and communities

Provinces 

Province of Salamis - Salamina
Province of Aegina - Aegina
Province of Troizinia - Methana
Province of Hydra and Spetses - Hydra
Province of Kythira - Kythira
Province of Piraeus - Piraeus
Note: Provinces no longer hold any legal status in Greece.

References

External links 
  Official website

Prefectures of Greece
Geography of Attica
History of Piraeus
Islands (regional unit)
1972 establishments in Greece
2010 disestablishments in Greece
States and territories established in 1972
States and territories disestablished in 2010